FICC is an abbreviation that may refer to:

 FICC (film festival), the Mexico City International Film Festival
 FICC (banking), the group within an investment bank that handles fixed income instruments, currencies, and commodities
 Fixed Income Clearing Corporation, a subsidiary of Depository Trust & Clearing Corporation 
 First Issues Collectors Club, an international society for collectors of the first postage stamps
Fédération Internationale de Camping et de Caravanning, an international federation of camping, caravaning and autocaravaning clubs